St. Peter's College of Engineering and Technology is a co-educational engineering college located in Avadi, Chennai, Tamil Nadu, India. It is affiliated with Anna University.

History
The college was started in the year of 2008 by Lakshmi Saraswathi Educational Trust, Trust was established in the year 1992.

References

External links
 

Engineering colleges in Chennai
Educational institutions established in 2008
Colleges affiliated to Anna University
2008 establishments in Tamil Nadu